Ebrahim Bur (also Romanized as Ebrāhīm Būr; also known as Ebrāhīmābād) is a village in Baryaji Rural District, in the Central District of Sardasht County, West Azerbaijan Province, Iran. At the 2006 census, its population was 49, in 10 families.

References 

Populated places in Sardasht County